Alipore (Pron:ˌɑ:lɪˈpɔ:) is a neighbourhood in south Kolkata, in Kolkata district, in the Indian state of West Bengal.

It is flanked by the Tolly Nullah to the north, Bhowanipore to the east, the Diamond Harbour Road to the west and New Alipore to the south, bordered by the Budge Budge section of the Sealdah South section railway line.

Geography

Location
It has an average elevation of 14 metres (46 feet).
Alipore area is bordered by the following roads - AJC Bose Road to the north, D L Khan Road to the East, Diamond Harbour Road to the West and Alipore Avenue to the south.

Police district
Alipore police station is part of the South division of Kolkata Police. It is located at 8, Belvadere Road, Kolkata-700027.

Tollygunge Women's police station has jurisdiction over all the police districts in the South Division, i.e. Park Street, Shakespeare Sarani, Alipore, Hastings, Maidan, Bhowanipore, Kalighat, Tollygunge, Charu Market, New Alipur and Chetla.

Transport
Alipore is connected to all parts of the city by extensive bus services.
Alipore is served by the Majherhat and New Alipore railway stations on the Budge Budge section of Kolkata Suburban Railway.

The Kalighat metro station of the Kolkata Metro as well as the Jatin Das Park station is close to Alipore.

See also
 Alipore (Vidhan Sabha constituency)
 New Alipore
 Zoological Garden, Alipore

References

External links 

Official site of the National Library

 
Neighbourhoods in Kolkata